Dorothy E. Roberts (born March 8, 1956) is an American sociologist, law professor, and social justice advocate. She is the Penn Integrates Knowledge Professor, George A. Weiss University Professor, and inaugural Raymond Pace and Sadie Tanner Mossell Alexander Professor of Civil Rights at the University of Pennsylvania. She writes and lectures on gender, race, and class in legal issues. Her concerns include changing thinking and policy on reproductive health, child welfare, and bioethics.

Background 
Roberts is the Penn Integrates Knowledge Professor, George A. Weiss University Professor, and inaugural Raymond Pace and Sadie Tanner Mossell Alexander Professor of Civil Rights at University of Pennsylvania. She holds appointments there in the Law School and Departments of Africana Studies and Sociology. Her books include Killing the Black Body: Race, Reproduction, and the Meaning of Liberty (Random House/Pantheon, 1997) where she describes the use of Norplant and other contraceptives in population control, Shattered Bonds: The Color of Child Welfare (Basic Books/Civitas, 2002), and Fatal Invention: How Science, Politics, and Big Business Re-create Race in the Twenty-First Century (New Press, 2011), as well as six co-edited works on constitutional law and gender. In 2022 she published Torn Apart (Basic Books) in which she details a case for abolishing the child welfare system, which she calls the family-policing system, as part of the prison abolition movement. She also has published over 80 articles and essays in books and scholarly journals, including Harvard Law Review, Yale Law Journal, and Stanford Law Review.

Roberts was born, in Chicago, Illinois. She received her Bachelor of Arts from Yale University and her Juris Doctor from Harvard Law School. She has been a professor at Rutgers and Northwestern University, a visiting professor at Stanford and Fordham, and a fellow at Harvard University's Program in Ethics and the Professions, Stanford's Center for Comparative Studies in Race and Ethnicity, and the Fulbright Program. She serves as chair of the board of directors of the Black Women's Health Imperative, on the board of directors of the National Coalition for Child Protection Reform, and on the advisory boards of the Center for Genetics and Society and Family Defense Center. She also serves on a national panel that is overseeing foster care reform in Washington State and on the Standards Working Group of the California Institute for Regenerative Medicine (stem cell research). She received awards from the National Science Foundation, the Robert Wood Johnson Foundation, and the 2010 Dorothy Ann and Clarence L. Ver Steeg Distinguished Research Fellowship.

Roberts credits her decision to become a lawyer and to go into law teaching about reproductive justice based on her assumption that women deserve the absolute right to not only obtain reproductive health services, but also to make decisions about their reproductive lives. However, she did not begin her career only intending to protect the right to abortion. She partially contributes her interest in the field of reproductive justice due to the intense regulation of Black women's bodies when it comes to motherhood, the long history of their denial of the right to have or raise their children, and the systemic lack of control that Black women have over decisions made about reproductive matters.

Author/lawyer 
Roberts has published more than 50 articles and essays in books, scholarly journals, newspapers, and magazines, including Harvard Law Review, Yale Law Journal,  University of Chicago Law Review, Social Text, and The New York Times. She has written Shattered Bonds: The Color of Child Welfare (Basic Civitas Books, 2002) and Killing the Black Body: Race, Reproduction, and the Meaning of Liberty (Pantheon Books, 1997), in which she purports to give "a powerful and authoritative account of the on-going assault—both figurative and literal—waged by the American government and our society on the reproductive rights of Black women." and was the co-author of casebooks on constitutional law and women and the law. Killing the Black Body received a 1998 Myers Center Award for the Study of Human Rights in North America.

Her article, "Punishing Drug Addicts Who Have Babies: Women of Color, Equality, and the Right of Privacy" (Harvard Law Review, 1991), has been widely cited. Fatal Invention (The New Press, 2011) argues that America is once again on the brink of classifying population by race.

Roberts has received much praise for her work from notable sources such Publishers Weekly and Anthony D. Romero, executive director, American Civil Liberties Union.

Lecturer/professor 
Roberts has delivered several endowed lectures, including the James Thomas Lecture at Yale Law School. She was elected twice by the Rutgers University School of Law graduating class to be faculty graduation speaker, and was voted outstanding first-year course professor by the Northwestern University School of Law class of 2000. She received the Radcliffe University Graduate Society Medal in June 1998. Her current projects concern race and child welfare policy.

Roberts has been a visiting professor at the University of Pennsylvania and Stanford University.

In 2002–03, she was a Fulbright Scholar at the centre for Gender and Development Studies, University of the West Indies, Trinidad and Tobago, where she conducted research on family planning policy and on gender, sexuality, and HIV/AIDS in the Caribbean. She is currently conducting research on the significance of the spatial concentration of state supervision of children in African American communities and on the use of race in biomedical research and biotechnology.

Roberts is featured in the documentary film, Silent Choices, about abortion and reproductive rights from the perspective of African Americans. Roberts also served as an advisor to the film.

In 2019, Roberts gave the Betsy Wood Knapp '64 Lecture at Wellesley College. Her topic for this lecture was "The Problem with Race-Based Medicine." In the lecture, Roberts asserts that race, in medicine, is used as a proxy for the more complex aspects of health and disease that should require further investigation. Roberts notes that this topic is especially relevant in the age of genomic science where the desire is to reduce all aspects of disease and infection to a genetic origin. According to Roberts, this is an inaccurate assumption and can powerfully impact the medical treatment of women, children, and African-Americans.

Views 
Roberts has drawn parallels between what she sees as current U.S. imperialism and white supremacy. She has asserted that U.S. torture of terrorist suspects is a tool to maintain supremacy just as violence has been used to maintain white supremacy, and has compared the treatment of prisoners at Abu Ghraib prison to racist lynchings of blacks.

Roberts has asserted that women should be able to choose if they bear a child and how they raise it. However, she notes that these decisions are often dependent on the social conditions in which women live, any discrimination they face, and whether they value the idea of childbearing. Roberts also concludes that this choice, along with the choice to have a relationship with the child, must be respected by the state and by society, which does not happen to Black women who are often subject to government interference during their parenthood. In her views on reproductive justice, Roberts includes issues of social justice as well in order to ensure that women and men are able to make independent, informed reproductive decisions when it comes to whether or not to have children and their relationships with their children.

Scholarly contributions 
Throughout the years, Roberts has explored topics such as race, reproduction, and motherhood in her scholarship. Additionally, through her writings she has taken her analysis a step further to examine the interconnectivity of these issues, specifically in regards to the experiences of black women.

Fatal Invention 
Roberts explores the dangers of the continued research of race in the science and medical fields in her book Fatal Invention. In this book Roberts asserts that genomic science and biotechnology is reinforcing the concept of race as a biological category. She cautions the continued research of race at a molecular level which is being used to hide current racism in the country and continues a racial division by justifying racial differences. Roberts mentions that even after the Human Genome Project proved that race could not be identified in our genes, there is still an interest in race-based genetic variation in medicine. Roberts points out the paradoxical nature of this continued interest as Americans continue to ignore the crushing effects of health disparities and racial inequalities in society. Roberts suggests that when doing research on individuals instead of framing the question as how does it affect different racial groups the question should be framed as how does it affect human beings.

At the beginning of the book, Roberts reviews the history of the invention of race. She argues that race is not just a social construct, it is also politically charged and has been disguised as a biological category to justify racial injustice. Roberts writes, “the problem with this interpretation of race as a social construction is that it ignores its political – and not biological – origin. The very step of creating race, dividing human beings into these categories is a political practice”. She wants to move beyond race just being a social construction and begins her analysis by explaining the political origins of race and how it was utilized for economic means. The purpose of recounting the history is to emphasize that racial categories are not natural, but that they were created.

Sex Power & Taboo: Gender and HIV in the Caribbean and Beyond 
Roberts along with Rhoda Reddock, Sandra Reid and Dianna Douglass study the outbreak of HIV in the Caribbean in Sex, Power, And Taboo: Gender and HIV in the Caribbean and Beyond. Using an interdisciplinary view, the authors research how different factors like gender, norms, and power affect HIV.  Gender is emphasized in order to better understand the outbreak of HIV because the authors believe gender impacts sexuality. Roberts, Reddock, Reid and Douglass argue that by looking at HIV through these different lens people will be able to create programs to end the spread of HIV. Sexuality and gender is also explored in order to be used to end HIV and AIDS epidemic through academics, public health and policy professions.

Sex, Power and Taboo incorporates the research presented at a conference at the University of the West Indies with the theme of gender, sexuality and HIV. The authors for this book come from different parts of the world and from different types of academic fields. The authors in this book attempts to shape gender and sexuality in the Caribbean in a different view from the perspective of the Global North.

"The Problem with Race Based Testing" TedX talk 
Roberts gives a TEDx talk titled "The Problem with Race Based Medicine" which was posted online in February 2016. In this TEDx talk Roberts addresses the practice of race based medicine and finds it hurtful to patients. Roberts uses her own observations and talks with medical professionals to conclude that race is used to prescribe, treat, and diagnose patients. The use of race in the medical field is used as a shortcut and as a result can become a distraction by relying on a social construction in order to make biological determinant. Roberts gives an example of a medical test, GFR (glomerular filtration rate), that takes race into account when testing patients. Another problem that Roberts brings up with race medicine is that it relies on bias and stereotypes that can negatively affect patients and cites the example of the stereotype that people of color can handle more pain. This negative stereotype that people of color can handle more pain can lead to patients not receiving the medication they need. Roberts says that race medicine can contribute to social inequality by continuing the racial discrimination.

Race- based medicine is” a system by which research is done by primarily using race as an essential, biological variable, translates into clinical practice, and leads to inequitable care.” According to Robert's TED Talk about the "Importance Race Based Medicine", she talks about how race “runs deep in throughout all of medical practices. It plays a part of diagnosis, treatment, prescriptions etc. Doctors are supposed to treat patients with evidence based African Americans are said to have more muscle mass than other race. Doctors are using race to determine a general trait or diagnosis. She says race is a bad proxy because race cannot determine the health issues based on race.It blinds doctors to illnesses  Race can't substitute as a good way to distinguish Black and Latino people are twice as likely to receive the pain medicine that Whites because of idea of that they can handle more pain. Roberts talks about Samuel Daniel Cartwright a physician during civil, who believe that slavery was a beneficial thing for the black people. He created drapetomania. Race specific medicines is the practice of medicine and treatment specifically to their race. Dorothy Roberts talks about how this is not a fair way to treat people because everybody has different medical needs regardless of their race. She addresses that there is a history of Black people being perceived to be able to handle more pain than other race.  There was a notion that white a black people have lung differences. Slave owners wanted to prove that slaves had weaker lungs that their white save owners. Therefore, the physicians on the plantation used the spirometer. It has been used to examine lung functions. To operate the device the race among other information has to be entered which makes this a race specific treatment in medicine.

According to Dorothy Roberts, “race is not a good proxy” for medicine. She said that they should focus on resources and the actual disease itself. There are still so many racial issues and all people do not get fair treatment. She also talks about lack of access to medical care for minorities and not having access to treatment. Roberts also discusses the stress of discrimination for Black and Latino people.

Shattered Bonds: The Color of Child Welfare 
This book, published by Roberts in 2001, outlines the American foster care system by highlighting the system's many failures, especially in aiding poor, Black parents attempting to raise their children. Roberts discusses the current state of the child-welfare system in America by using her intimate knowledge of the system. Using firsthand accounts, Roberts details how thousands of children annually are removed from their parents' homes, often due to the endemic effects of poverty that impact women and children more than any other group in the United States. Roberts not only describes the racial differences in foster care, but she also highlights the discrimination that comes with high concentration of state intervention in certain neighborhoods, the struggle of poor families in meeting state standards for regaining custody of their children, and the relationship between state supervision and systemic racial inequality.

"Racism and the Patriarchy in the Meaning of Motherhood" 
In her piece "Racism and the Patriarchy in the Meaning of Motherhood," Roberts offers insight into the intersecting roles of racism and patriarchy and their deep effects on motherhood for black women in society. Roberts opens the article, broadly discussing an explanation of how women differ in their gendered experiences based on their race, as the intersectional oppression that black women face varies than their white counterparts. She then delves into the impact of racism and the patriarchy, their complex relationship to each other, and argues that racism and patriarchy cannot be separated in their impact on the lives of black women, specifically in regards to how they feel about motherhood and how society perceives black mothers. She explains that there are shared experiences amongst all mothers, but that raising black children in a racist, patriarchal society poses its own pain and struggle. Roberts argues that the social construction of motherhood, which was made by those in power, leads to the stigmatization of mothers who do not fit this mold. Roberts article goes on to outline a brief history of black mothers experience dating back to slavery, through the 19th-century "Cult of Domesticity", and into modern-day discourse surrounding poverty. Roberts concludes with a call to understand the interplay of racism, sexism, patriarchy, and how ending racism is a necessary step in the feminist fight to end sexism.

"Race and the New Reproduction" 
In her piece "Race and the New Reproduction," Dorothy E. Roberts outlines scientific developments regarding reproduction, more specifically focusing on in vitro fertilization or IVF as well as surrogate/contract pregnancies. Roberts notes that many feel that advancements in the field of reproduction work to provide new technologies that are beneficial to those desiring to become parents. Roberts argues that while these new advancements in reproductive technologies offer individuals who are shut out of reproducing without the aid of reproductive technology the opportunity to have children, they still ultimately conform to societal norms that are annexed onto family. Her evidence outlines that the majority of individuals who use and benefit from IVF or other forms of reproductive technologies tend to be heterosexual couples due to social, racial, cultural, economic, as well as legal implications. She argues then that the idea of the nuclear family consisting of a mother, father, and children remains intact due to who is accessing these resources. Roberts uses a feminist perspective to argue that patriarchal norms are invoked with new forms of reproductive technology, as married men strongly benefit from these practices, and that they continue to play into a hierarchy system in the United States that is categorized by race. Roberts finds that IVF is predominately used by white individuals and that legal cases and stories surrounding the mistaken use of sperm or eggs from black donors in IVF treatments are often highly sensationalized in the media. She notes that black individual's lack of access to reproductive technologies is a reflection of issue of their lack of access to healthcare more generally. She additionally notes that sometimes black individual's cultural norms, which stress the importance and significance of familial blood ties, which she argues is linked to a history of slavery and patriarchy, become barriers to accessing these types of technologies. Roberts concludes by noting the serious racial disparities that exist between black and white individuals in their efforts to use these reproductive technologies.

Dorothy Roberts: Killing the Black Body

Killing the Black Body was written by Dorothy Roberts after she read about the articles that came out in the 1980s about black women being arrested for using drugs during their pregnancy. Roberts saw this as “the prosecutions punishing black women for having babies”. This led Roberts to doing research on the history of punitive policies directed towards African American women. She became interested in writing about the regulations of childbearing for black women. Dorothy says,” I want this book to convince readers that reproduction is an important topic and that it is especially important to Black people.”   

Dorothy discusses the issues of reproduction when it comes to the Black woman. She talks about slavery and how it has affected Black women mentally and physically over time. Dorothy addresses the experience of motherhood for Black women. She addresses the struggles that these women have faced since the beginning of slavery. Black women were used during slavery to produce babies that would be the property of the slave masters at conception. The worth of these women were determined by fertility. The more children they could produce for their masters, determined how high their auction prices would be. She talks about the treatment of slaves by their slave owners. She talks about the ways that the White slave owners would treat their slaves that were Black women. Not only were they enslaved, but their bodies were enslaved. They had no control over their reproductive systems even though it was their body.

Infertile slaves were not valuable to their slaveholders Women who were not fertile were sold off or even worse things were done to them. The slave were very angry that the slaves could not produce, so they would inflict “cruel physical and psychological” punishment on those female slaves. They felt that infertile female slaves was a “loss on their investment”. On the other hand, fertile slaves were very valuable to her master. They were often sold to another owner. The only way a woman could avoid being separated from her family was if she started having children early on and very often.

In “Killing the Black Body, there is a report presented to the General Anti-Slavery Convention held in London in 1840. The report stated, “Where fruitfulness is the greatest of virtues, barreness will be regarded as worse than a misfortune, as a crime and the subjects of it will be exposed form of privation and affliction. Thus deficiency wholly beyond the slave's power becomes the occasion of inconceivable suffering.”

In one of Dorothy's lectures, she talks about Black women's wombs being seen as a threat to society. This is why she believes that people try to do things to prevent them from producing offspring such as sterilization and contraceptives.

Female slaves were raped by their slave masters. The female slaves could legal be “stripped, beaten, mutilated, bred, and compelled to toil alongside men.” There were laws in states like Louisiana and Virginia, but they did not protect the Black women from being raped by their white slave owners. “The crime of rape does not apply to African slaves.” Raping Black women did not exist as crime. Even when they were rape it was not seen as a crime because somehow it ended being something that they “deserved” and has been viewed as acceptable, when it would be terrible crime if it was done to a White woman.

Dorothy also addresses the narratives that were given to Black women by their slave owners such as the names “Jezebel” and “Mammy”. Dorothy talks about the views of Black women and how they have never been viewed as the ideal women “From the moment they set foot in this country as slaves, Black women have fallen outside the American ideal of womanhood.” and viewed differently than women of other races.

As a result of Black women being subjected to sexual abuse, they were given either of the two names to put a label on them. According to “Killing the Black Body”, the meaning behind the name “Jezebel” was the Black woman that seemed “willing” to engage in sexual intercourse.  Jezebel originated from the character of the biblical wife of King Ahab. According to “Killing the Black Body”, Jezebel was a “purely lascivious creature: not only was she governed by her erotic desires, but her sexual led men to wanton passion.” The type of woman that would be called this was one who was “easy” and never had to be forced into sexual acts because she was “always ready”. On the contrast, there was the women they would consider “Mammy”. She was the Black female house servant who cared for her master's children. She was seen as the type of woman that would nurture and take care of the children. This name became popular during the Jim Crow Era. This character was a part of the cult during this era. She was a symbol of the “good Black woman” According to the narrative given to this type of woman, she was viewed as the perfect slave and woman. Dorothy addresses the degradation of Black women and the origination of all of the negative stigmas associated with them. In Killing the Black Body”, Roberts says that “Racist thinking dictates that Black bodies, intellect, character, and culture are all inherently vulgar.”

"The Child Welfare System's Racial Harm" 
In her piece "The Child Welfare System's Racial Harm," Roberts deconstructs why the child welfare system is overpopulated with black youth, and how the fatal flaw of the child welfare system continues to create, facilitate, and perpetuate the material welfare gap between black and white Americans. She begins by arguing that poverty and racial bias are the two main structural pillars contributing to the insufficient equality of opportunity between the blacks and whites. Roberts makes the case that parental income is a higher correlated indicator for forced child removal by child protection services than the actual alleged severity of the abuse toward the child by the parent(s). Adding further that since blacks are disproportionately poorer than their white counterparts due to systemic inequities, there is a carryover effect that perpetuates institutional racism in the child welfare system by reinforcing explicit and implicit stereotypes. Roberts argues that the cultural conflict between the white nuclear family structure and the black shared parenting cooperative structure results in blacks being falsely accused of child neglect when in fact, black parent(s) are simply attempting save money on child care costs while strengthening their network of kin. She then delves into the impact of how removing black children from this extended family, albeit under the guise of child protection from parental neglect, ultimately only serves to fracture the black community by stunting the social development and stability of their youth.

This disconnect between white and black familial structures she argues, is the source of the child welfare system's fundamental flaw. In essence, while the black community believes that "it takes a village to raise a child", America's white hegemonic individualistic culture assumes from the start that children's basic needs for sustenance and development can and must be met solely by the parents; any failure to comply with this cultural assumption is socially perceived as culpable deviance and implies that such parents are unfit for parenthood. Roberts contends that this fatal flaw is the impetus for a myriad of governmental shortcomings in the child welfare system. Among them, the government's failure to recognize the external economic, political, and social constraints that can prevent black parents from adequately providing for their children; the state only coming in to retroactively save children who are experiencing difficulty as opposed to proactively increasing their welfare benefits in order to preempt such negative results; and the government's refusal to address systemic inequities, such as the affordability of childcare, in favor of saddling the blame for parental failure on the parents' predetermined inadequacy alone. Roberts concludes with the argument that all of these factors culminate in the disintegration of black family life due to the increasing number of black children who never achieve a stable and loving home life during their most formative years of childhood. As such, these youth are prone to deep-seated senses of insecurity, lack of identity, and low self-worth which deteriorates the black community over time. Case and point, the so-called "school-to-prison pipeline".

"The Social and Moral Cost of Mass Incarceration in African American Communities" 
In her piece "The Social and Moral Cost of Mass Incarceration in African American Communities," Roberts details how and why the skyrocketing growth of prison population, particularly of black inmates, is morally unjustifiable, empirically detrimental in the long-term, evidentially misguided at best and politically predatory through its use of identity politics at worst. She argues this from an intersectional perspective on 3 fronts; the damaging of social networks, distorting of social norms, and the destructing of social citizenship. Roberts begins by dissecting the what she deems the 3 distinctive features of American Incarceration. First, the shear scale in number, and disproportionality in percentage of the black prison inmate population relative to their white and Hispanic counterparts. Especially considering the fact that African Americans are an outright statistical minority in the national population of Americans which, she notes, subsequently makes them overrepresented in the prison population. Second, the rate of incarceration and, third, the spatial concentration of the disadvantaged communities that produce these inmates. Roberts argues that the fracturing of these localized social networks, specifically by mass incarceration, is what reverberates into decreased social mobility for the entire black community. She emphasizes that a large part of the problem in properly conducting prison research resides in seeking to punish the individual causes of crime as opposed to alleviating the communal consequences of mass incarceration.

In utilizing her communal consequences approach, she uncovers how mass incarceration damages social networks by over-relying on extended family members for financial assistance, childcare, emotional support, and transportation to and from visiting appointments with the incarcerated family member. Furthermore, Roberts connects this process to the distorting of social norms by reducing the number of role models and father-figures youth have to look up to as they come of age. She also establishes the link that less black male and female presence in a disadvantaged community puts it at greater risk of crime because the adults that remain are too preoccupied with compensating socioeconomically for their household to partake in the social groups such as, churches, clubs, and neighborhood associations which would normally enforce the social controls that preserve community safety. Lastly, she articulates how social citizenship is destroyed post-incarceration via felon disenfranchisement, labor market exclusion, and social isolation. She laments that mass incarceration of African Americans is shortsighted in that it fails to account for the long-term socioeconomic status costs of reducing the pool of potentially skilled laborers by discouraging potential employers, eroding job skills, and undermining social connections to stable job opportunities, particularly for convicts of petty offenses.

Awards and honors 

 1998 recipient of the Myers Center Award for the Study of Human Rights in North America
 2015 recipient of the Solomon Carter Fuller Award
 Northwestern University School of Law's Kirkland & Ellis Professor
 Faculty fellow at the Institute for Policy Research
 Fellow at Harvard University's Program in Ethics
 Fellow at Stanford's Center for Comparative Studies in Race and Ethnicity
 Chair of the board of directors of the Black Women's Health Imperative
 Member of the board of the National Coalition for Child Protection Reform
 2022 elected member of the American Academy of Arts and Sciences

References

External links 
 
 "Dorothy Roberts"  National Coalition for Child Protection Reform
 "Dorothy Roberts Exposes How Science, Politics and Big Business Are Re-Creating Race Issues From Her Book Fatal Invention" Brainstormin' with Bill Frank
 IPR People: Dorothy Roberts
 Dorothy Roberts: Race, Class, and Care Boston Review
 Northwestern News: Child Welfare Discourse Fails to Factor in Racial Bias

1956 births
Living people
Writers from Evanston, Illinois
Northwestern University faculty
American legal scholars
Yale University alumni
Harvard Law School alumni
African-American lawyers
American lawyers
University of Pennsylvania Law School faculty
21st-century African-American people
20th-century African-American people
Members of the National Academy of Medicine
Prison abolitionists
Fellows of the American Academy of Arts and Sciences
African-American women lawyers